The Suna is a river in the Republic of Karelia, Russia. The length of the river is 280 km. The area of its basin is 7,670 km2. The Suna originates in Lake Kivi-Yarvi and flows out into the Kondopoga Bay of Lake Onega.

References

Rivers of the Republic of Karelia